Alfred Hunt may refer to:

Alfred Hunt (steel magnate) (1817–1888), founding president of the company that became Bethlehem Steel Corporation
Alfred E. Hunt (1855–1899), founder of the company that became the aluminum company Alcoa
Alfred William Hunt (1830–1896), English painter
Alfred Hunt (politician) (1861–1930), Australian politician

External links
Albert Hunt (disambiguation)